Savi is a town in Benin that was the capital of the Kingdom of Whydah prior to its capture by the forces of Dahomey in 1727. 

An account of the city was given by Robert Norris in 1789:

There were British, French, Dutch and Portuguese factories in the city, adjacent to the Royal Palace. They were essentially involved in the slave trade.

References

 Norris, Robert (1789), Memoirs of the reign of Bossa Ahádee London: Printed for W. Lowndes.
 Ross, David. "Robert Norris, Agaja, and the Dahomean Conquest of Allada and Whydah" in History in Africa, 16 (1989), 311–324.
 Harms, Robert. The Diligent: A Journey through the Worlds of the Slave Trade. New York: Basic Books, 2002. p. 155-156.

Populated places in Benin